Quercorbès or Quercorb, also Kercorbès, Kercorb, Chercorbès, Chercorb (Occitan: Quercorbés or Quercòrb), is a small natural region of France in the department of Aude, around the former castle of Quercorb. Historically, it stood between the county of Foix and Carcassonne. It is a region of small isolated mountains arising from the plain of Chalabre and the plateau of Puivert.

References

External links
 Quercorbès tourist site in French and English

Natural regions of France